Margaret Parker is a British Paralympic archer.

Parker competed at the 2004 Paralympic Games where she won a gold medal in the women's team event.

References

Year of birth missing (living people)
Living people
British female archers
Paralympic archers of Great Britain
Paralympic gold medalists for Great Britain
Paralympic medalists in archery
Archers at the 2004 Summer Paralympics
Medalists at the 2004 Summer Paralympics
21st-century British women